The  Chernogorivka and Novocherkassk cultures (c. 900 to 650 BC) are Iron Age steppe cultures in Ukraine and Russia, centered between the Prut and the lower Don. They are pre-Scythian cultures, associated with the Cimmerians.

In 1971 the Vysokaja Mogila kurgan (graves number 2 and 5) was excavated in the Lower Dnieper River basin. Grave number 5 dates to the late Chernogorivka period (900–750 BC) and grave number 2 to the younger Novocherkassk period (750–650 BC).

The Novocherkassk culture expands to a larger area between the Danube and the Volga and is associated with the Eastern European Thraco-Cimmerian artefacts.

References
SOME PROBLEMS IN THE STUDY OF THE CHRONOLOGY OF THE ANCIENT NOMADIC CULTURES IN EURASIA GEOCHRONOMETRIA Vol. 21, pp 143–150, 2002 – Journal on Methods and Applications of Absolute Chronology
Archaeological cultures of Eastern Europe
Archaeological cultures in Russia
Archaeological cultures in Ukraine
Indo-European archaeological cultures
Iron Age cultures of Europe
Nomadic groups in Eurasia
Cimmerians
Novocherkassk